Sarah Elizabeth Ulmer  (born 14 March 1976) is a former Olympic cyclist. She is the first New Zealander to win an Olympic cycling gold medal, which she won in the 3km individual pursuit at the 2004 Athens Olympics setting a world record.

After the 2004 Olympics, she held the Olympic, Commonwealth and World Championship Pursuit titles, and the records for those events.

Biography
Ulmer was born in Auckland, where she studied at the Diocesan School for Girls.
Her grandfather Ron Ulmer was a track cyclist for New Zealand at the 1938 British Empire Games.
Her father Gary was a national road and track champion.

Individual pursuit races
In 1994 she won the World Junior Championship and placed second at the 1994 Commonwealth Games in Canada with a time of 3 minutes 51 seconds.

At the 1996 Atlanta Olympics she was seventh after qualifying 6th with 3m 43s.

At the 1998 Commonwealth Games in Kuala Lumpur she won the gold medal with 3m 41.7s.

At the 2000 Sydney Olympics she qualified 4th with 3m 36.8s and came 4th after losing the ride off for third by 0.08 of a second.

At the 2002 Manchester Commonwealth Games she won the gold and set a games record of 3m 32.4s.

In May 2004 she won the World Championship in Melbourne and set a world record of 3m 30.6s in qualifying.
At the Athens 2004 Olympics she broke the world record in qualifying with 3m 26.4s and took almost two seconds off that time to win the gold in the final with 3m 24.5s. Ulmer reduced the world record by six seconds.
The silver and bronze medalists, Katie Mactier from Australia and Leontien Ziljaard-van Moorsel from the Netherlands, also went under the previous world record (3m 30.6s) in each of their three rides. They rode faster with each ride and rode 3m 27.6s and 3m 27.0s respectively in the finals.

As of September 2014 nine current world cycling records for distances of 4 km or less have been set at Aguascalientes.

The current world championship record of 3m 27.268s was set by fellow New Zealander, Alison Shanks in Melbourne in 2012.

Other races
Ulmer did well in points races, winning a junior world championship and placing 3rd and 4th at senior world championships. She placed 2nd and 5th (twice) at Commonwealth Games.

After the 2004 Olympics she switched to road racing. The Cycling Archives website includes results for her competing in road races in the US, France, Australia, Belgium and Germany from 1999 to 2006.

Other information
Ulmer trained at the velodrome in Te Awamutu. Her home town is Cambridge. Ulmer has two daughters.

In the 2005 New Year Honours, Ulmer was made an Officer of the New Zealand Order of Merit, for services to cycling.

Ulmer announced her retirement from cycling on 24 November 2007. She attended the 2008 Olympics as a mentor.

In 2011, Ulmer signed up as an 'ambassador' for the New Zealand Cycle Trail.

Palmarès

Source:   
All pursuits are 3 km individual, apart from two 2 km junior pursuits.

1993
2nd  Pursuit World Junior Championships (2km)

1994
1st  Pursuit World Junior Championships (2km)
1st  Points Race World Junior Championships
2nd  Pursuit Commonwealth Games
5th Points Race Commonwealth Games

1995
1st Pursuit, National Championships
2nd Points Race, National Championships
3rd Sprint, National Championships
2nd Pursuit, Australia National Championships
1st Pursuit, Adelaide World Cup
3rd Points Race, Adelaide World Cup
1st Pursuit, Quito World Cup
1st Pursuit, Tokyo World Cup

1996
1st Pursuit, National Championships
2nd Points Race, National Championships
7th Pursuit Atlanta Olympics
 
1998
1st  Pursuit Commonwealth Games
2nd  Points Race Commonwealth Games
2nd Pursuit, National Championships
1st Points Race, National Championships

1999
3rd  Points Race World Championships
6th Pursuit, World Championships
2nd Pursuit, Texas World Cup
2nd Pursuit, Cali World Cup

2000
4th Pursuit Sydney Olympics
8th Points Race Sydney Olympics
1st Pursuit, Cali World Cup
2nd Pursuit, Turin World Cup

2001
1st Pursuit, Mexico City World Cup
1st  National Criterium Championships

2002
1st Pursuit National Championships
1st Points Race National Championships
1st  National Criterium Championships
1st Pursuit, Sydney World Cup
1st Scratch Race, Sydney World Cup
3rd Points Race, Sydney World Cup
1st  Pursuit Commonwealth Games  
5th Points Race Commonwealth Games

2003
4th Pursuit World Championships
1st Pursuit, Mexico World Cup
1st Pursuit, Sydney World Cup
3rd Points Race, Sydney World Cup
3rd Scratch Race, Sydney World Cup
1st Pursuit, National Championships
1st Points Race, National Championships
3rd 500m Time Trial, National Championships

2004
1st  Pursuit World Championships
4th Points Race World Championships
1st Pursuit, Mexico World Cup
3rd Scratch Race, Mexico World Cup
1st Pursuit, Sydney World Cup
3rd Points Race, Sydney World Cup
1st  Pursuit Olympic Games
6th Points Race Olympic Games

2005
1st  National Road Race Championships
1st  National Time Trial Championships
1st  Road Race Oceania Games
1st  Time Trial Oceania Games

2006
1st Tour of New Zealand
1st World Cup Road Race Wellington

2007
3rd National Road Race Championships

Photo gallery

References

1976 births
Living people
New Zealand female cyclists
Olympic cyclists of New Zealand
Cyclists at the 1996 Summer Olympics
Cyclists at the 2000 Summer Olympics
Cyclists at the 2004 Summer Olympics
Olympic gold medalists for New Zealand
Cyclists at the 1994 Commonwealth Games
Cyclists at the 1998 Commonwealth Games
Cyclists at the 2002 Commonwealth Games
Cyclists at the 2006 Commonwealth Games
Commonwealth Games gold medallists for New Zealand
Commonwealth Games silver medallists for New Zealand
Officers of the New Zealand Order of Merit
Olympic medalists in cycling
Cyclists from Auckland
Medalists at the 2004 Summer Olympics
UCI Track Cycling World Champions (women)
Sportspeople from Cambridge, New Zealand
Commonwealth Games medallists in cycling
New Zealand track cyclists
20th-century New Zealand people
21st-century New Zealand people
Medallists at the 1994 Commonwealth Games
Medallists at the 1998 Commonwealth Games
Medallists at the 2002 Commonwealth Games